The Battle of Settepozzi was fought in the first half of 1263 off the island of Settepozzi (the medieval Italian name for Spetses) between a Genoese–Byzantine fleet and a smaller Venetian fleet.

Genoa and the Byzantines had been allied against Venice since the Treaty of Nymphaeum in 1261, while Genoa, in particular, had been engaged in the War of Saint Sabas against Venice from 1256. In 1263, a Genoese fleet of 48 ships, which was sailing to the Byzantine stronghold of Monemvasia, encountered a Venetian fleet of 32 ships. The Genoese decided to attack, but only two of the four admirals of the Genoese fleet, and 14 of its ships took part and were easily routed by the Venetians, who captured four vessels and inflicted considerable casualties.

The Venetian victory and the demonstration of Genoese reluctance to confront them had important political repercussions, as the Byzantines began to distance themselves from their alliance with Genoa and restored their relations with Venice, concluding a five-year non-aggression pact in 1268. After Settepozzi, the Genoese avoided confrontation with the Venetian navy, instead focusing on commerce raiding. This did not prevent another, even more, lopsided and complete defeat at the Battle of Trapani in 1266.

Background
When Michael VIII Palaiologos became ruler of the Byzantine Greek Empire of Nicaea, he set about realizing the Nicaean ambition to recover Constantinople, the former capital of the Byzantine Empire, which since the Fourth Crusade in 1204 had been the seat of the rival Latin Empire. By this time, the Latin Empire was a weak remnant of its former self, but was backed by the naval might of the Republic of Venice, which contributed to the failure of two large-scale Nicaean attempts to capture the city in 1235 and 1260. The latter failure especially made the need to counter the Venetian fleet apparent to Palaiologos. Only one state possessed that ability: the Republic of Genoa.

Venice's main commercial rival, Genoa had been embroiled since 1256 in the War of Saint Sabas against Venice, and after a reverses suffered in the conflict, the city was faced with the prospect of being cut off entirely from the lucrative Levantine trade. Seeking a way out, as well as a diplomatic coup that would bolster his own internal position against the Genoese nobility, the autocratic Captain of the People, Guglielmo Boccanegra, dispatched an embassy to Palaiologos offering an alliance. The resulting Treaty of Nymphaeum, signed on 13 March 1261, obliged Genoa to furnish a fleet of 50 vessels, with their expenses paid by the Emperor, but in exchange secured very advantageous commercial terms; following a successful recovery of Constantinople, the Genoese stood to effectively inherit and even expand upon the privileged position that the Venetians held in the Latin Empire.

In the event, Constantinople was recovered by the Nicaean general Alexios Strategopoulos barely a fortnight after the treaty was signed, without the need for Genoese naval assistance. Nevertheless, Michael VIII scrupulously observed the terms of the Treaty of Nymphaeum, as Genoese naval strength was still necessary to confront a potential Venetian counterstrike while a native Byzantine fleet was slowly being re-established. With the Emperor's subsidies, the Genoese were able to increase their fleet strength considerably. For a year after the recapture of Constantinople, both Venice and Genoa remained passive in the Aegean Sea: Venice hesitated to confront the numerically far superior fleet that Genoa had dispatched to the area, and awaited political developments in Italy, while Genoa suffered from internal turmoil with the overthrow of Boccanegra and the assumption of power by a collective leadership representing the noble houses of the city.

In the summer of 1262, the Venetians ordered a 37-galley fleet into the Aegean, which met the Genoese fleet of 60 ships under Ottone Vento at Thessalonica. The Genoese refused to engage, but were also able to obstruct Venetian attempts to blockade them in port. A piratical foray by the nobles of Negroponte, who were allied with Venice, into the Marmara Sea was confronted and defeated by a Byzantine–Genoese squadron. Meanwhile, hostilities broke out in the Morea (the Peloponnese peninsula), where Michael VIII dispatched an expeditionary force (in late 1262 or early 1263) against the Principality of Achaea. Despite initial successes, Byzantine attempts to conquer the entirety of the principality were decisively defeated at Prinitza and Makryplagi.

Battle
Some time in early 1263, a Genoese fleet of 38 galleys and 10 saette, crewed by some 6,000 men and commanded by four admirals, was sailing to the Byzantine fortress and naval base of Monemvasia in the south-eastern Morea. At the island of Settepozzi (Spetses) it encountered a Venetian fleet of 32 galleys, under Guiberto Dandolo, sailing north to Negroponte.

The details of the engagement are not very clear. According to the Genoese Annales Ianuenses, when the signal to attack was given, only fourteen Genoese ships under two of the admirals, Pietro Avvocato and Lanfranco Spinola, advanced, while the rest stood back and then suddenly fled. The Venetian chronicler Martino da Canal, however, records that the Venetian ships attacked first, while the Genoese were deployed in four ranks of ten ships each. According to Canal, the Venetians boarded two of the Genoese flagships and, once they captured them and cut down their flags, the other two admirals turned and fled. The battle ended in a clear Venetian victory: the Genoese fleet lost many men, including Avvocato, and the Venetians captured four Genoese ships, including the flagships of the two admirals. Canal put Genoese casualties—"exaggeratedly perhaps", according to the historian Deno Geanakoplos—at 1,000 men (600 killed or wounded and 400 captured), as compared to 20 killed and 400 wounded on the Venetian side.

According to the Annales Ianuenses, the hesitation of the Genoese fleet to engage may have been due to the fact that the Venetians claimed immunity as crusaders. On the other hand, the Genoese navy generally failed to effectively confront its Venetian counterpart throughout the war; often, according to naval historian John Dotson, "because of divided or ineffective command", which was also in evidence at Settepozzi. The historians Frederic Lane and Deno Geanakoplos explain the Genoese commanders' reluctance to risk their ships by pointing out that these were owned by private contractors, usually the rich noble merchants who ran the city, and thus constituted valuable assets for which the admirals were answerable.

Questions of chronology and details
The 14th-century Venetian historian Andrea Dandolo placed the battle at the end of the tenth year of Doge Reniero Zeno's reign, i.e., either in late 1262 or January 1263, whereas the Annales Ianuenses simply record it under the year 1263. Modern historians generally place the battle in the spring of 1263: the medievalist Georg Caro placed it in March at the latest, whereas the naval historian Camillo Manfroni suggested May as the most likely time. Geanakoplos, largely following Manfroni, placed the battle in the period May–July 1263.

The Annales Ianuenses mention the battle directly after the sailing, on 28 May 1263, of a fleet of 25 galleys and six other ships to reinforce their fleet operating in the Aegean, under the admirals Pietrino Grimaldi and Pesceto Mallone, implying that they were involved in the battle. However, the Byzantinist Albert Failler considers that this fleet probably sailed before news of Settepozzi had arrived in Genoa, and that it did not engage in any combat, while the medievalist Michel Balard suggests that the fleet defeated at Settepozzi may have been sailing to Monemvasia to unite with the new fleet coming from Genoa. While the fleet sailed for Monemvasia "on the emperor's orders" according to the Annales, its direct connection with the Byzantine operations in the Morea, such as the arrival of Byzantine troops at Monemvasia mentioned in a letter of Pope Urban IV, is uncertain.

In addition, the exact identity of the two admirals who were not engaged in battle is unknown. Canal reports that one of them was a Greek, and the presence of Byzantine ships in the Genoese fleets is mentioned in the sources. However, the only Byzantine fleet commander attested by name during this time, Alexios Doukas Philanthropenos, was active in the Aegean islands, rather than along the coasts of the Greek mainland.

Repercussions

Although most of the Genoese fleet survived the battle, and in its aftermath managed to capture four Venetian taride cargo vessels full of provisions sailing for Negroponte, the Genoese established a court of inquiry on the battle, and condemned the surviving admirals, councillors, and pilots "for their excesses ... and malfeasance in the areas of Romania [i.e., the Byzantine East]". No further details are given in the Annales but, as Geanakoplos remarks, "it is nevertheless a significant indication of guilt that such terms could be used by the more or less official chronicle of the [Republic of Genoa]".

Subsequently, the Genoese avoided direct confrontations with the Venetian battle fleet and engaged in commerce raiding against the Venetian merchant convoys, achieving a notable success in 1264 at the Battle of Saseno. In 1266 the main Genoese fleet of 27 galleys was defeated and captured in its entirety by the Venetians at the Battle of Trapani. The war between the two powers lasted until 1270, when King Louis IX of France coerced both to sign the Treaty of Cremona.

Apart from the loss in lives and ships, the long-term ramifications of the defeat at Settepozzi were political: Michael VIII began to reconsider the alliance with Genoa, which was very costly but had so far brought little in return. The Emperor had shown signs of impatience with his allies before, but now he made his frustration public: soon after the battle Michael VIII dismissed sixty Genoese ships from his service and, according to Canal, severely dressed down the Genoese podestà in Constantinople. Genoese ships were soon allowed to return to Imperial service, but Michael VIII began to delay the payments for their crews. The Byzantine–Genoese rift culminated in 1264, when the Genoese podestà was implicated in a plot to surrender Constantinople to Manfred of Sicily, whereupon the Emperor expelled the Genoese from the city.

Michael VIII signed a treaty with the Venetians on 18 June 1265, but it was not ratified by Doge Zeno. In the face of the threat from Charles of Anjou after 1266, Michael VIII was forced to renew his alliance with Genoa, but also maintained his détente with Venice, signing a five-year non-aggression pact in June 1268.

Footnotes

References

Sources

 
 
 
 
 
 
 
 
 
 
 
 

1260s in the Byzantine Empire
1263 in Europe
13th century in Greece
Conflicts in 1263
Medieval Aegean Sea
Michael VIII Palaiologos
Naval battles involving the Byzantine Empire
Naval battles of the Venetian–Genoese wars
Military history of Greece
War of Saint Sabas
Byzantine Empire–Republic of Genoa relations